Nico's Last Concert: Fata Morgana is a live album documenting Nico's performance at a show called Fata Morgana – Wüstenklänge im Planetarium (Fata Morgana – Desert Sounds in the Planetarium), held on June 6, 1988 in West Berlin as part of the European Capital of Culture festival that year. The concert (organized by musician Lütz Ulbrich) took place at the planetarium of the Wilhelm-Foerster-Sternwarte. Except for the album's closing song (which was previously released on The End...), Nico and her backing band the Faction composed all the pieces specifically for the show, during which they were accompanied by optical effects and Moon-themed projected pictures and films.

As the title of the album indicates, the concert was Nico's last, and the material on the album is among the last she (co-)wrote. Six weeks later, on July 18, she died while on vacation in Ibiza.

Track listing
All songs written by Nico, James Young, Graham Dowdall and Henry Olsen; except tracks 4, 6 and 8, which are by Nico alone.

"The Sound I" – 10:42
"The Hanging Gardens of Semiramis" – 9:17
"Your Voice" – 7:17
"I Will Be Seven" – 6:41
"Fata Morgana" – 6:49
"All Saints' Night" – 6:23
"The Sound II" – 6:17
"You Forget to Answer" – 3:57

Personnel
Nico – vocal, Indian pump organ
The Faction
James Young – piano, synthesiser
Henry Olsen – guitar
Graham "Dids" Dowdall – drums, percussion
Technical
Robert Sydow – engineer
Otto Schönthaler – mixing engineer

References
The album's liner notes
[ Allmusic entry]

Nico albums
Live albums published posthumously
1994 live albums